Universal Aviation Corporation was an airline holding company based in United States.

History 
Universal Aviation Corporation was stood up to merge operations of Universal Air Lines Corporation, Robertson Aircraft Corporation and Northern Air Lines Universal owned 10 percent of Fokker Aircraft and participated in a stock swap with Western Air Express. In 1929, Universal Aviation purchased Braniff Air Lines. In 1929, Universal Aviation Corporation became part of the Aviation Corporation. American Airlines was formed from the merger of Universal and 90 other companies.

Destinations 
United States
Cleveland (Airport)
Kansas City
St. Louis
Tulsa

Fleet 

In 1929 UAC operated the following aircraft.

Fairchild 71
Fokker F.10A
Fokker F.32
Fokker Super Universal

See also 
 List of defunct airlines of the United States

References

External links 

Defunct airlines of the United States